Hvozdnice is a name of several places in the Czech Republic:
 Hvozdnice (Hradec Králové District), municipality in Hradec Králové District
 Hvozdnice (Prague-West District), municipality in Prague-West District
 Hvozdnice River, tributary of Moravice River